Edward Vischer  (1809–1878) was a German-born painter and photographer who migrated from Germany to Mexico at the age of nineteen. He is best known for his pencil sketches of California landscapes throughout the 1860s and 1870s.

Career

In Mexico, he worked with the commercial house of Heinrich Virmond, traveling throughout the Pacific Coast region of the Americas. In 1835, he visited Peru on business, where he lived with artist Mauritius Rugendas and met Charles Darwin.  In 1842, he became interested in California and agreed to travel there for Virmond.

Vischer is best known for his pencil sketches of California landscapes throughout the 1860s and 1870s. He sketched a wide variety of scenes and objects, but most commonly the California missions, trees, mountains, and rural scenes.  His 1870 publication Pictorial of California gathered together nearly 200 drawings, forming the first comprehensive documentation of California scenery.  He followed this in 1872 with an album of drawings of California missions; another volume of mission drawings was published in 1878, the year of his death.

Death
Edward Vischer died on December 24, 1878, in San Francisco, California.

Published works
A partial list of Vischer's works include:
 Sketches of the Washoe Mining Region (1862).
 Views of California: The Mammoth Tree Grove, Calaveras County, California, and Its Avenues (1862).
 Pictorial of California (1870)
 The Mission Era: California Under Spain and Mexico (1872)
 Drawings of the California Missions (1878)

Gallery

External links
 Edward Vischer Drawings, Photographs and Other Material in the Claremont Colleges Digital Library
 The Mission Era: California Under Spain and Mexico and Reminiscences (ca. 1850-1878), online pictorial collection, The Bancroft Library
 Edward Vischer website

References

 

1809 births
1878 deaths
American illustrators
Spanish missions in California